The West Indian Students' Centre (WISC) was located at 1 Collingham Gardens, Earls Court, London, in a building bought with the support of West Indian governments, and officially opened on 1 June 1955 by Princess Margaret. Hosting activities and events primarily for students from the West Indies, WISC also became a key London venue for others from the African diaspora, and provided facilities and a meeting place for such organisations as the West Indian Standing Committee, the Commission for Racial Equality, and the Caribbean Artists Movement (CAM), which latter grouping held regular public sessions there from March 1967. Among leaders from the Caribbean who when visiting the UK made a point of speaking at meetings organised at WISC were Norman Manley, Eric Williams, Forbes Burnham, and Cheddi Jagan,

References

1955 establishments in the United Kingdom
Afro-Caribbean culture in London